Hoppea is a genus of plants in the family Gentianaceae. Species include:
Hoppea dichotoma Willd.
Hoppea fastigiata (Griseb.) C.B.Clarke

References

Gentianaceae
Gentianaceae genera